Xanthonymus astrape, the false pathfinder skipper, is a species of butterfly in the family Hesperiidae. It is found in Sierra Leone, Liberia, Ivory Coast, Ghana, Togo, Nigeria, Cameroon, Equatorial Guinea, Gabon, the Republic of the Congo, the Central African Republic, the Democratic Republic of the Congo and Uganda. The habitat consists of the edges of forests and forest clearings.

Adults of both sexes are attracted to flowers.

The larvae feed on Trachyphrynium braunianum.

References

Hesperiinae
Butterflies of Africa
Butterflies described in 1892